Mount Chamberlin is the third highest peak in the Brooks Range, Alaska, USA. Mount Chamberlin is within the Arctic National Wildlife Refuge and was named for Thomas Chrowder Chamberlin (1843-1928), geologist of the Peary Auxiliary Expedition of 1894. Previously believed to be the highest peak in the Brooks Range, in 2014 new measurement technology established that Mount Chamberlin is the third highest peak in the range.

References

Mountains of Alaska
Mountains of North Slope Borough, Alaska
Brooks Range